Günther Uecker (born 13 March 1930) is a German sculptor, op artist and installation artist.

Biography 

Uecker was born in Wendorf, Mecklenburg. Uecker began his artistic education in 1949 when he took up studies at Wismar. He then went to the art school in Berlin-Weißensee and in 1955 to Düsseldorf, where he studied under Otto Pankok at the Kunstakademie Düsseldorf. In 1956 he began using nails in his art.

Uecker met the group ZERO with Heinz Mack and Otto Piene in 1960, artists who propagated a new beginning of art in opposition to the German Informel. He occupied himself with the medium of light, studied optical phenomena, series of structures and the realms of oscillation that actively integrate the viewer and enable him to influence the visual process by kinetic or manual interference. Uecker, Mack and Piene began working together in joint studios at the Stedelijk Museum in Amsterdam in 1962 and installed a 'Salon de Lumière' at the Palais des Beaux-Arts in Paris. Other 'light salons' followed in Krefeld and in Frankfurt. Since 1966, after the group ZERO dissolved and a last joint exhibition, Uecker increasingly used nails as an artistic means of expression—a material that, until today, stands in the centre of his oeuvre. At the beginning of the 1960s he began hammering nails into pieces of furniture, musical instruments and household objects, and then he began combining nails with the theme of light, creating his series of light nails and kinetic nails and other works.  a-x Zero Garden from 1966, in the collection of the Honolulu Museum of Art, demonstrates his use of nails to create the illusion of movement.  Light and electricity continued to be one of the main subjects and natural materials such as sand and water were included in his installations, resulting in an interaction of the different elements to create a sensation of light, space, movement and time. Uecker's oeuvre includes painting, object art, installations as well as stage designs and films. His origins explain his interest in the eastern European avant-garde of the 1920s and 1930s, but he is likewise interested in Asian cultures and their ideas. His works can be seen in collections and large fairs in the West as well as the East. Uecker's artistic creativity reaches a climax in 2000 in the prayer room he designs for the rebuilt Reichstag building in Berlin.

Uecker taught from 1974 until 1995 at the Kunstakademie Düsseldorf and was promoted to professor in 1976. Halina Jaworski was  his first master student (Meisterschülerin).

With  Otto Piene, Heinz Mack and Mattijs Visser he founded in 2008 the international ZERO foundation. The foundation has the complete ZERO archives from three Düsseldorfer artists as well as documents and photos from other related artists.

Exhibitions
In addition to numerous Gruppo Zero exhibitions, Uecker has participated in many other exhibitions, including documenta 4, Kassel, Germany (1968), the Venice Biennale (1970), and numerous solos shows, including one at the Kunsthalle Düsseldorf (1983), a retrospective at the Kunsthalle der Hypo-Kulturstiftung, Munich (1990), and another solo show at the Ulmer Museum, Ulm, Germany (2010). He had his first solo exhibition in the United States at the Howard Wise Gallery on West 57th Street, showing important work such as the kinetic New York Dancer I (1966). He designed the scenery for Richard Wagner's Lohengrin at Bayreuth (1979–82).

His first solo show since 1968 took place early 2021 at the Lévy Gorvy gallery in Paris, called Lichtbogen, where he presented a new set of art inspired by a visit to an island in the Straits of Ormuz.

Uecker's work can be found in the collections of major institutions worldwide, among them: the ZERO foundation and Museum Kunst Palast, Düsseldorf; Calderara Foundation Collection, Milan; Courtauld Institute of Art, (London); Honolulu Museum of Art, the Schleswig-Holstein Museums (Germany), Studio Esseci (Padua, Italy), Stedelijk Museum, Amsterdam, Van Abbemuseum (Eindhoven, Netherlands), Von der Heydt-Museum (Wuppertal, Germany); Museum of Modern Art, New York; Art Institute of Chicago, Chicago; Museum of Contemporary Art, Los Angeles; Centre Pompidou, Paris; Peggy Guggenheim Collection, Venice the Ulster Museum, Belfast; and the Walker Art Center, Minnesota.

Art market 
At Art Basel in 2014, art dealer Dominique Lévy sold Uecker's suite of eight white paintings for more than 5 million euros. In a 2017 Christie's Post-War Auction Gunther's Spirale 1/ Spirale 2 sold for an artist auction record of 3.2 million dollars.

Literature 
 Beate Reifenscheid and Dorothea van der Koelen; Arte in Movimento – Kunst in Bewegung, Dokumente unserer Zeit XXXXIV; Chorus-Verlag; Mainz 2011;  
 "ZERO in Europa, Das erste gemeinsame Gespräch mit Piene, Mack und Uecker nach Ende von Zero", von Heinz-Norbert Jocks, in: Lettre International, Berlin, Herbst 2011 
 "ZERO, Internationale Künstler Avantgarde", exhibition catalog published by Museum Kunst Palast and Cantz, with essays by Jean-Hubert Martin, Valerie Hilling, Heinz-Norbert Jocks Catherine Millet and Mattijs Visser, Düsseldorf/Ostfildern 2006, 
 "Artempo, Where Time Becomes Art", exhibition catalog published by Musei Civici Veneziani, with essays by Jean-Hubert Martin, Heinz-Norbert Jocks, Massimo Cacciari, Giandomenico Romanelli and Mattijs Visser, MER Paper Kunsthalle Ghent 2007, 
 Wulf Herzogenrath and Dorothea van der Koelen: Dokumente unserer Zeit XXXIII : Panta Rhei, Chorus – Verlag, Mainz 2005, 
 "ZERO in NY", exhibition catalog edited by Mattijs Visser, published by the ZERO foundation and Sperone Westwater, New York/Düsseldorf/Ghent 2008, 
 Britta Julia Dombrowe: Redepflicht und Schweigefluss. Zur Gestalt, Bedeutung und Funktion von Günther Ueckers Bibliophilen Werken. Dissertation, Universität zu Köln, Köln 2006 (Volltext)
 Günther Uecker, Alexander Tolnay: Günther Uecker. Hatje Cantz, 2005, 
Günther Uecker, Volkhard Knigge, Jürgen M. Pietsch: Ein Steinmal in Buchenwald, hrsg. vom Politischen Club Colonia (PCC) und der Gedenkstätte Buchenwald. Edition Akanthus, Spröda 1999, 
 Günther Uecker. Zwanzig Kapitel. Mit Beiträgen von Wulf Herzogenrath, Dieter Honisch, Britta Schmitz, Alexander Tolnay, Stephan von Wiese und Kazuhiro Yamamoto. Neuer Berliner Kunstverein/Hatje Cantz Verlag, Ostfildern-Ruit 2005, 
Heinz-Norbert Jocks: Archäologie des Reisens, Ein anderer Blick auf Günther Uecker, Köln (DuMont), 1997
'Gunther Uecker – Im Kreis Gehen Ouroboros'; exhibition catalogue  published by Har-El Printers & Publishers, Jaffa, 2018  

See also
 Never Look Away (film), Uecker is depicted sympathetically during his early Kunstakademie Düsseldorf years in this 2018 German film based loosely on the life of artist Gerhard Richter.

References

External links 
 ZERO foundation
 ZERO group
 A tribute to Günther Uecker with photos and interview from Cà Pesaro Venice exhibition, September 2012
Upcoming exhibition at the Guggenheim Museum- ZERO: Countdown to Tomorrow 1950s–60s
 The Book of Job artist book, published by Har-El Printers & Publishers; collection of Deutsche Bundestag

1930 births
Living people
People from Ludwigslust-Parchim
People from the Free State of Mecklenburg-Schwerin
20th-century German sculptors
20th-century male artists
German male sculptors
21st-century German sculptors
21st-century male artists
Op art
German contemporary artists
Kunstakademie Düsseldorf alumni
Academic staff of Kunstakademie Düsseldorf
Members of the Academy of Arts, Berlin
Knights Commander of the Order of Merit of the Federal Republic of Germany
Recipients of the Pour le Mérite (civil class)